WWE (World Wrestling Entertainment, Inc.) has promoted several women's championships over the years.

WWE Women's Championship may refer to:
 Women's championships in WWE, article detailing all women's championships in WWE history
 WWE Women's Championship (1956–2010), the predecessor to the subsequent women's championships
 WWE Raw Women's Championship, originally also called the WWE Women's Championship, the current women's championship of the Raw brand
 WWE SmackDown Women's Championship, the current women's championship of the SmackDown brand
 NXT Women's Championship, the current women's title for the NXT brand
 NXT UK Women's Championship, the current women's championship of the NXT UK brand
 WWE Divas Championship, a women's championship contested from 2008–2016
 WWE Women's Tag Team Championship, WWE's current women's tag team championship

See also
 WWF Women's Tag Team Championship, a women's tag team championship contested from 1983–1989
 NWA World Women's Championship, WWE recognizes the Fabulous Moolah's reign as being part of the original (1956–2010) WWE Women's Championship's history